Chandra Prasad Saikia (1927–2006)  was a writer from Assam, India. He was the president of the Asam Sahitya Sabha held at Hajo and Jorhat district, Assam in 1999 and 2000, respectively. Saikia was born on 8 July 1927 in Jalukgaon, Jhanji in Sivasagar district, Assam. After having primary education in Sivasagar he had left for Kolkata for higher education.

Literacy Works
 Novels
 Edin
 Meghamallar
 Uttarkal
 Suryasnan
 Mandakranta
 Janmantar
 Maharathi
 Tore More Alokare Yatra

Short story collections
 Mayamriga
 Nachpati Phool
 Chakrabat
 Angikar
 Chandra Prasad Saikiar Nirbachita Galpa

 Miscellaneous
 Dristikon
 Nirbachita Sampadakiya
 Americar Chithi

Saikia was also editor of various journals and newspapers, including Goriyoshi, The Assam Tribune, Prakash, Natun Dainik, and Asom Batori.

Awards and honours
 Assam Valley Literary Award
 Sahitya Akademi Award
 Padma Bhushan (2007)
 Publication Board Award (2000).

See also
 Assamese literature
 History of Assamese literature
 List of Asam Sahitya Sabha presidents
 List of Assamese writers with their pen names

References

Novelists from Assam
Asom Sahitya Sabha Presidents
1927 births
2006 deaths
People from Sivasagar district
Recipients of the Padma Bhushan in literature & education
Recipients of the Sahitya Akademi Award in Assamese
Recipients of the Assam Valley Literary Award
20th-century Indian novelists
20th-century Indian short story writers